Rechensky is a rural locality (a khutor) and the administrative center of Rechenskoye Rural Settlement, Alexeyevsky District, Volgograd Oblast, Russia. The population was 408 as of 2010.

Geography 
Rechensky is located on the right bank of the Akishevka River, 29 km southwest from Alexeyevskaya (the district's administrative centre) by road. Nesterovsky is the nearest rural locality.

References 

Rural localities in Alexeyevsky District, Volgograd Oblast